Super Bowl LIX is the planned American football championship game of the National Football League (NFL) for the 2024 season. It will be the 59th Super Bowl and the game is scheduled to be played on February 9, 2025, at the Caesars Superdome in New Orleans, Louisiana.

It will be the eighth Super Bowl played in the Superdome, and the eleventh in the city of New Orleans, the most recent being Super Bowl XLVII in 2013, held in the same venue (then called Mercedes-Benz Superdome). The game will be televised nationally by Fox.

Background

Host selection
On May 23, 2018, the league originally selected New Orleans as the site for Super Bowl LVIII, to be tentatively played on February 4, 2024. 

In March 2020, the league and the NFLPA agreed to expand the regular season from 16 to 17 games starting in 2021, pushing Super Bowl LVIII to February 11, 2024, and causing a conflict with New Orleans's Mardi Gras celebrations. On October 14, 2020, the league decided to move Super Bowl LVIII to another city (Las Vegas was later chosen as the host of Super Bowl LVIII) and award New Orleans Super Bowl LIX instead, as Mardi Gras in 2025 is not until March.

Broadcasting
Super Bowl LIX will be televised by Fox as part of the four-year rotation between CBS, Fox, NBC, and ABC/ESPN.

International
In the United Kingdom and Ireland, the game will be televised on the free-to-air channel ITV.
In Latin America, the game will be televised by ESPN and its streaming and on-demand platform Star+.
In Germany and Austria, the game will be televised by RTL Group (RTL, Nitro)

References

External links
 

Super Bowl
21st century in New Orleans
2025 in American football
2025 in sports in Louisiana
American football competitions in New Orleans
February 2025 sports events in the United States
Scheduled sports events